The following people have all been grandmasters (GM) of chess. The title is awarded to players who have met the standards required by the sport's governing body, FIDE. Other than world champion, it is the highest title a chess player can attain and is awarded for life, although FIDE regulations allow for the revocation of titles for cheating or fraud. FIDE has awarded  grandmaster titles, not counting three GM titles that have been revoked.

Grandmasters
Player names are generally listed as they appear in FIDE records such as the FIDE Chess Profile pages, although accented letters are used where they apply, which FIDE databases simplify to the English alphabet. When player names or spellings have changed, the most recent is used even if it is different than that when the title was awarded which is then listed in the Notes column. Variants in transliteration such as "Alexei"  "Alexey" are not mentioned.

FIDE has issued ID codes since 1998; some older grandmasters were never assigned an ID. For living grandmasters, this field is a weblink to the FIDE Chess Profile page which usually gives the year the GM title was awarded and the player's birth year. FIDE IDs for deceased grandmasters are retained in this table to aid matching with older FIDE records such as the FIDE rating lists.

Title Year is the year FIDE officially awarded the title. Sometimes this may be a year after the player completed the final  requirements for the title. In a few cases (e.g. Esteban Canal), the title was awarded retrospectively, many years after the relevant achievements.

The player's federation is stated at the time the GM title was awarded. If the player later changed federations, this is listed in Notes.

The Notes column gives the entire row's sources and those from 1950 to 2016 are equally in Chess International Titleholders, 1950–2016 by Di Felice.

Revoked titles
FIDE titles including the grandmaster title are valid for life, but FIDE regulations allow a title to be revoked for "use of a FIDE title or rating to subvert the ethical principles of the title or rating system" or if a player is found to have violated the anti-cheating regulations in a tournament on which the title application was based.

{| class="sortable mw-datatable wikitable"
|+ Revoked GM Title Awards
! Name !! FIDE ID !! Born !! Died !! Year !! Revoked !! Federations !! Sex !! Notes
|-
| Crişan, Alexandru || 1201271 || 1962-07-31 || || 1993 ||style="text-align: center;"|2015 || Romania || align="center"|M ||Date of title revocation is unclear 
|-
| Nigalidze, Gaioz || 13603078 || 1989-04-24|| || 2014 || style="text-align: center;"|2015 || Georgia || align="center"|M || FIDE Ethics Commission Case n. 7/2015; GM title application
|-
| Rausis, Igors || 11600098 || 1961-04-07 || || 1992 || style="text-align: center;"|2019 || Latvia • Bangladesh • Czech Republic || align="center"|M || FIDE Ethics Commission Case n. 8/2019
|}

See also 
 List of chess players by peak FIDE rating

Notes

Obituaries

References 

  (main source to verify titles awarded through 2016)
  (alternative source for birthplace and biographical dates and year title awarded for most players earning titles before 1987)

External links 
 FIDE Title Applications

Grandmasters